Genesis is an annual professional wrestling pay-per-view (PPV) event promoted by Impact Wrestling. The name was originally used on May 9, 2003, for a two-hour DirecTV special that highlighted early moments in TNA’s history.

Genesis was actually not amongst the original names used by TNA for its first twelve pay-per-view events, but ultimately was added to the rotation as the thirteenth pay-per-view name during a time of name shuffling on the part of TNA Management. All events but three have been held in the Impact Zone. Originally, Genesis was held in November, but was moved to January starting in 2009. For this reason, 2008 did not have a Genesis PPV event. There have only been five World Championship matches in the main event. Genesis was later televised as an Impact Wrestling television special on Spike TV on January 16, 2015, and on Pop in 2017 and 2018.

On December 12, 2020 at Final Resolution, it was announced that Genesis would be revived as a monthly special for Impact Plus on January 9, 2021.

Events

References

External links
 Genesis 2007 at In Demand.com
 TNAWrestling.com - the official website of Total Nonstop Action Wrestling